Cossonus horni, is a species of weevil found in Sri Lanka.

Description
Typical length of the adult is about 3.2 to 3.6 mm. Body piceous to reddish brown. Prothorax much darker. Head impunctate except for a few small scattered punctures on the forehead. There is an elongate fovea in forehead without any transverse impression. Rostrum stout, parallel-sided in the basal half, and quadrangularly dilated at the apex. There are small scattered punctures on rostrum. Antennae reddish brown, where the scape is shorter than funicle. Prothorax subpyriform, broad, and rounded laterally. The discal areas on each side with very sparse small punctures. Scutellum subquadrate, transverse, and impunctate. Elytra flat on the disk, with deep striae containing strong close punctures. Ventrum with very fine sparse punctures on the mesosternal process.

References 

Curculionidae
Insects of Sri Lanka